"Special" is a song by American singer and rapper Lizzo. It serves as the title track from her fourth studio album of the same name. It was released to Italian contemporary hit radio on January 13, 2023, as the third single from the album. A remix featuring American singer SZA was released on February 9, 2023.

Live performances 
Lizzo debuted the song on the forty-seventh season of Saturday Night Live on April 16, 2022, three months before its release. She performed the song on Today on July 15, 2022, the same day as the release of its parent album. Lizzo performed the song at the 65th Annual Grammy Awards, accompanied by a gospel choir.

Music video 
Lizzo released the music video for "Special" on February 1, 2023. In the video, she portrays a "beleaguered and put-upon waitress" who is secretly a superhero at night.

Charts

Release history

References

2022 songs
2023 singles
Lizzo songs
SZA songs
Atlantic Records singles
Songs written by Lizzo
Songs written by Max Martin
Songs written by Ian Kirkpatrick (record producer)
Songs written by Pop Wansel